Zaydou Youssouf (born 11 July 1999) is a French professional footballer who plays as a midfielder for Portuguese club Famalicão.

Club career

Early career
Youssouf made his professional debut for Bordeaux in a 1–1 Ligue 1 away draw against Bastia on 30 November 2016.

Saint-Étienne
On 5 July 2019, Youssouf signed with Ligue 1 side Saint-Étienne.

Famalicão
On 4 August 2022, Youssouf signed a four-year contract with Famalicão in Portugal.

Personal life
Youssouf was born in France, and is of Comorian Malagasy descent. He is married to Nawëal Ouinekh.

Career statistics

References

External links
 France profile at FFF
 
 Fox Sports Profile
 

1999 births
Footballers from Bordeaux
Black French sportspeople
French sportspeople of Comorian descent
Living people
Association football midfielders
French footballers
France youth international footballers
FC Girondins de Bordeaux players
AS Saint-Étienne players
F.C. Famalicão players
Ligue 1 players
Ligue 2 players
Championnat National 2 players
Championnat National 3 players
Primeira Liga players
French expatriate footballers
Expatriate footballers in Portugal
French expatriate sportspeople in Portugal